Bow River Station is a pastoral lease that operates as a cattle station in Western Australia.

Gold was found in the area in 1885, with squatters occupying grazing lands in 1888.

See also
List of ranches and stations
List of pastoral leases in Western Australia

References

Pastoral leases in Western Australia
Stations (Australian agriculture)
Homesteads in Western Australia
Kimberley (Western Australia)